Highland Hall, also known as the Courthouse Annex, was a Presbyterian seminary, an historic school building for females, a radio school during World War II, and a county office building before it became a retirement home in 2016. It is located in Hollidaysburg, Blair County, Pennsylvania. 

Highland Hall was added to the National Register of Historic Places in 1978.

History and architectural features
Designed by noted Philadelphia architect Samuel Sloan (1815-1884), Highland Hall was built sometime around 1865. It is now a four-story, "L"-shaped, stone building that features a mansard roof, which was a characteristic of the Second Empire style.
Highland Hall was added to the National Register of Historic Places in 1978.

It was originally built to serve as a Presbyterian seminary for both sexes. In 1911, it became a female academy and was officially named Highland Hall. It continued to be used as a girls' school until 1940.

Highland Hall was added to the National Register of Historic Places in 1978.

In 1940 it became a Roman Catholic Minor Seminary of the Third Order Regular Franciscans for young men studying for the priesthood. It closed in 1968 with four students who transferred to St. Bernardine's Monastery for residence and continued their studies at Bishop Guilfoyle High School in Altoona.

In 1969, it was converted into a county office building.
Highland Hall was added to the National Register of Historic Places in 1978.

Highland Hall was subsequently turned into a sixty-five and older, affordable housing facility. The renovation work was performed by Keller Engineers and S&A Homes.

References

School buildings on the National Register of Historic Places in Pennsylvania
Second Empire architecture in Pennsylvania
School buildings completed in 1865
Buildings and structures in Blair County, Pennsylvania
National Register of Historic Places in Blair County, Pennsylvania